Hendrik Petrus Berlage (21 February 185612 August 1934) was a Dutch architect. He is considered one of the fathers of the architecture of the Amsterdam School.

Life and work
Hendrik Petrus Berlage, son of Nicolaas Willem Berlage and Anna Catharina Bosscha, was born on 21 February 1856 in Amsterdam in the Netherlands. Anna Catharina Bosscha's uncle was Johannes Bosscha, a scientist who taught in Polytechnische School te Delft.

Berlage studied architecture at the Zurich Institute of Technology between 1875 and 1878 after which he traveled extensively for 3 years through Europe. In the 1880s he formed a partnership in the Netherlands with Theodore Sanders which produced a mixture of practical and utopian projects. A published author, Berlage held memberships in various architectural societies including CIAM I.

Berlage was influenced by the Neo-Romanesque brickwork architecture of Henry Hobson Richardson and of the combination of structures of iron seen with brick of the Castle of the Three Geckos of Domènech i Montaner. This influence is visible in his design for the Amsterdam Commodities Exchange, for which he would also draw on the ideas of Viollet-le-Duc. The load-bearing bare brick walls and the notion of the primacy of space, and of walls as the creators of form, would be the constitutive principles of the 'Hollandse Zakelijkheid'.

A visit Berlage made to the U.S. in 1911 greatly affected his architecture. From then on the organic architecture of Frank Lloyd Wright would be a significant influence. Lectures he gave when returned to Europe would help to disseminate Wright's thoughts in Germany.

A notable overseas commission was the 1916 Holland House, built as offices for a Dutch shipping company in Bury Street in the City of London (behind Norman Foster's 30 St Mary Axe of 2003).

Considered the "Father of Modern architecture" in the Netherlands and the intermediary between the Traditionalists and the Modernists, Berlage's theories inspired most Dutch architectural groups of the 1920s, including the Traditionalists, the Amsterdam School, De Stijl and the New Objectivists. He received the British RIBA Royal Gold Medal in 1932.

Berlage died on 12 August 1934 in The Hague. His son, also named Hendrik Petrus Berlage, was an astronomer in Royal Magnetic and Meteorological Observatory in Batavia, Dutch East Indies (now Jakarta, Indonesia), whose name has been immortalized as a lunar crater (Berlage).

Legacy 
The Berlage Institute has been a postgraduate school for architecture since 1990.

Works of Berlage are in the public collections of Museum de Fundatie, Gemeentemuseum Den Haag, and Kröller-Müller Museum.

References

Further reading
Sergio Polano, Giovanni Fanelli, Vincent Van Rossem (2002) : Hendrik Petrus Berlage, Phaidon Press, 
Hendrik Berlage (1996): Hendrik Petrus Berlage: Thoughts on Style, 1886-1909 (Texts & Documents), The Getty Center For The History Of Art, 
Kohlenbach (1991): H.P. Berlage: Schriften zur Architektur, Birkhäuser Basel;  (German edition)
Singelenberg, Pieter (1972):  H.P. Berlage. Idea and style. The quest for modern architecture, Utrecht, Haentjens Dekker & Gumbert
Dennis Sharp (1991): Illustrated Encyclopedia of Architects and Architecture, Watson-Guptill,  
Manfred Bock (1983), 'Anfange einer neuen Architektur. Berlages Beitrag zur architektonischen Kultur der Niederlande im ausgehenden 19. Jahrhundert', 's Gravenhage/Wiesbaden 1983.
Karin Gaillard, Betsy Dokter (ed.) (1992),'Berlage en Amsterdam Zuid';'Berlage en de toekomst van Amsterdam Zuid', Amsterdam 1992.

External links

Biography and works of Berlage
National Library of the Netherlands - dossier Berlage

1856 births
1934 deaths
Architects from Amsterdam
Congrès International d'Architecture Moderne members
Dutch architects
ETH Zurich alumni
Modernist architects
Recipients of the Royal Gold Medal